David Douglas Gustafson (born October 13, 1956) is a senior judge of the United States Tax Court.

Biography
Gustafson was born on October 13, 1956 in Greenville, South Carolina. He graduated summa cum laude from Bob Jones University in 1978, and with distinction from the Duke University School of Law in 1981, where he was a member of the Order of the Coif and executive editor of the Duke Law Journal (1980–1981). Gustafson was admitted to the District of Columbia Bar in 1981 and served as an associate at the law firm of Sutherland, Asbill and Brennan, in Washington, D.C., 1981–1983. He was a trial attorney (1983–1989), Assistant Chief (1989–2005), and Chief (2005–2008) in the Court of Federal Claims Section of the Tax Division in the U.S. Department of Justice; and Coordinator of Tax Shelter Litigation for the entire Tax Division (2002–2006). He won Tax Division Outstanding Attorney Awards in 1985, 1989, 1997, 2001–2005, and the Federal Bar Association's Younger Attorney Award, 1991. He was elected president of the Court of Federal Claims Bar Association (2001). He was appointed by President George W. Bush to be a judge of the United States Tax Court on July 29, 2008, for a term ending July 29, 2023. He assumed senior status on November 1, 2022.

Personal life 
Gustafson married Sharon Elizabeth Fast in 1980 and they have nine children.  Gustafson's father was the late composer Dwight Gustafson. Sharon Fast Gustafson served as the General counsel of the Equal Employment Opportunity Commission until March 2021.

References

Material on this page has been copied from the website of the United States Tax Court, a United States government agency, and the information is therefore in the public domain.

1956 births
Living people
21st-century American judges
Bob Jones University alumni
Duke University School of Law alumni
Judges of the United States Tax Court
United States Article I federal judges appointed by George W. Bush